The following are brands and firms of Slovenia.

Famous companies

 Gorenje : Producer kitchen appliances
 Radenska: sparkling water
 Barcaffe: Slovenian caffee
 Tomos: Slovenian motors
 Elan: producer of ski equipment, boats and other sport equipment. Also inventor of carving skis
 Krka: pharmaceutical company and exporter
 Pipistrel: aeroplane designer and manufacturer

Famous websites

 24ur.com: news web page 
 Najdi.si:  Slovenian search engine

 
Slovenian brands
Brands